Eshmunazar I (Phoenician: 𐤀𐤔𐤌𐤍𐤏𐤆𐤓 , a theophoric name meaning 'Eshmun helps') was a priest of Astarte and the Phoenician King of Sidon. He was the founder of his namesake dynasty, and a vassal king of the Achaemenid Empire. Eshmunazar participated in the Neo-Babylonian campaigns against Egypt under the command of either Nebuchadnezzar II or Nabonidus. The Sidonian king is mentioned in the funerary inscriptions engraved on the royal sarcophagi of his son Tabnit and his grandson Eshmunazar II. The monarch's name is also attested in the dedicatory temple inscriptions of his other grandson, King Bodashtart.

Etymology 
Eshmunazar is the Latinized form of the Phoenician theophoric name , meaning "Eshmun helps".

Chronology 
The absolute chronology of the Kings of Sidon from the dynasty of Eshmunazar I has been much discussed in the literature; traditionally placed in the course of the fifth century, inscriptions of this dynasty have been dated back to an earlier period on the basis of numismatic, historical and archaeological evidence. The most complete work addressing the dates of the reigns of these Sidonian kings is by the French historian Josette Elayi who shifted away from the use of biblical chronology. Elayi used extant documentation, including inscribed Tyrian seals and stamps excavated by the Lebanese archaeologist Maurice Chehab in 1972 from Jal el-Bahr, a neighborhood in the north of Tyre, Phoenician inscriptions discovered by the French archaeologist Maurice Dunand in Sidon in 1965, and the systematic study of Sidonian coins. According to her work Eshmunazar reigned from c. 575 BC to c. 550 BC.

Historical context 
Sidon, which was a flourishing and independent Phoenician city-state, came under Mesopotamian occupation in the ninth century BC. The Assyrian king Ashurnasirpal II (883–859 BC) conquered the Lebanon mountain range and its coastal cities, including Sidon. 

In 705, the Sidonian king Luli joined forces with the Egyptians and Judah in an unsuccessful rebellion against Assyrian rule, but was forced to flee to Kition with the arrival of the Assyrian army headed by Sennacherib. Sennacherib instated Ittobaal on the throne of Sidon, and reimposed the annual tribute. When Abdi-Milkutti ascended to Sidon's throne in 680 BC, he also rebelled against the Assyrians. In response, the Assyrian king Esarhaddon  captured and beheaded Abdi-Milkutti in 677 BC after a three-year siege; Sidon was stripped of its territory, which was awarded to Baal I, the king of rival Tyre and loyal vassal to Esarhaddon.

Sidon returned to its former prosperity, while Tyre was besieged for 13 years (586–573 BC) by the Chaldean king Nebuchadnezzar II. After the Achaemenid conquest in 529 BC, Phoenicia was divided into four vassal kingdoms: Sidon, Tyre, Byblos and Arwad. Eshmunazar I, a priest of Astarte and the founder of his namesake dynasty, became king around the time of the Achaemenid conquest of the Levant.

Reign 
Little is known about Eshmunazar I's reign. According to Elayi, Eshmunazar was a usurper since, unlike the customs of the Phoenician royalty, the name of his father is not mentioned in any of the royal inscriptions. Eshmunazar participated in the Neo-Babylonian campaigns against Egypt under the command of either Nebuchadnezzar II or Nabonidus. The Sidonian king seized Egyptian stone sarcophagi belonging to members of the Egyptian elite; three of these sarcophagi were unearthed in the royal necropolis of Sidon.

Epigraphic mentions 
Eshmunazar I is mentioned in the funerary inscriptions engraved on the royal sarcophagi of his son Tabnit and his grandson Eshmunazar II. The monarch's name is also attested in the dedicatory temple inscriptions of his other grandson, King Bodashtart.

Genealogy 
Eshmunazar I was the founder of his namesake dynasty;  his heir was his son Tabnit, who fathered Eshmunazar II from his sister Amoashtart.

See also 

 King of Sidon – List of monarchs of Sidon.

Notes

References

Citations

Sources

 

 

 
 
 

 
 
 
 

 
 

 

 

6th-century BC rulers in Asia
Kings of Sidon
Rulers in the Achaemenid Empire
6th-century BC Phoenician people